Hopea bilitonensis is a species of plant in the family Dipterocarpaceae. It is native to Sumatra and Peninsular Malaysia.

References

bilitonensis
Trees of Sumatra
Trees of Peninsular Malaysia
Critically endangered flora of Asia
Taxonomy articles created by Polbot